A Collection is the first greatest hits album of American pop-classical singer Josh Groban. It was released in late 2008 internationally.

The compilation takes tracks from his first three studio albums, Josh Groban (2001), Closer (2003), Awake (2006), as well as Groban's version of the Chess song "Anthem", from the 2009 Chess in Concert release. It contains one new song, a live version of "Weeping" (originally recorded for Awake) featuring South African singer Vusi Mahlasela and the Soweto Gospel Choir.  It also features "Smile", previously only available via the Internet edition of Awake.

The album also comes with a second disc of five selections from Groban's 2007 holiday album Noël as well as a Spanish version of "Silent Night" (Noche de Paz).

Track listing

Disc 1

Disc 2

Charts

Weekly charts

Year-end charts

Certifications and sales

References

External links
 

2008 greatest hits albums
Josh Groban albums
Albums produced by David Foster
143 Records compilation albums